Events from the year 1419 in Ireland.

Incumbent
Lord: Henry V

Deaths
 Murchad mac Brian Ó Flaithbheartaigh, Taoiseach of Iar Connacht and Chief of the Name
 Dauid mac Tanaide Ó Maolconaire
 Fercert Ó hUiginn, an Irish poet.